Ngoa Ekélé is a neighborhood in the Yaoundé III district of Yaoundé, Cameroon. It borders the neighborhoods of Olezoa to the south, Mvolyé to the west and Melen to the north. It is separated from the administrative center to the east by the Valley of Death or Nkol Nguet. The district is built on a ridge that culminates at 793 meters, it is the Plateau Atemengue.

Etymology 
"Ngoa Ekélé" is an Ewondo expression composed of "Ngoag", the stone, the rock, the pebble, and "Ekélé" meaning "is hung". Literally "Ngoa Ekele" could mean "(The) Stone (is) perched", "(The) Stone (is) suspended", "(The) Stone (is) hung".

History 
In 1911, during the German colonial period, a so-called indigenous customary court or "Tribunal de races" sat in this place and was presided over alternately by Joseph Atemengue (en) and Onambele Mbazoa. The decisions of this court were severe. Hanging over the heads of the defendants, they fell cleanly like a cleaver. "Ngoa Ekélé" would therefore refer to these court decisions as "stones perched" above the head of each defendant and ready to fall on it.

Population 
The population of Ngoa Ekele is mostly students. The students come from the ten regions of Cameroon, the population of the district is cosmopolitan.

Institutions 
Ngoa Ekélé is a student, political and military district.

Education 
 Panoramic view of some of the institutions in Ngoa Ekelle
 Ngoa Ekelle Castle
 Ngoa Ekélé has many schools and universities

Basic education 
 Departmental elementary school
 Mobile Gendarmerie Primary School
 Public nursery and elementary school of Plateau Atemengue

Secondary education 
 Government High School Ngoa Ekélé, former CES
 Government technical college Ngoa Ekélé
 General Leclerc High School

Higher education 
 National Institute of Youth and Sports (INJS)
 University of Yaoundé I
 National Post and Telecommunication and ICT College (SUP'PTIC)
 Advanced School of Mass Communication (ASMAC)
 Institute of Demographic Training and Research (IFORD)

Politics 
 Monument of the reunification.jpg
 The headquarters of the National Assembly of Cameroon is located in Ngoa Ekélé. There is also the Monument of the reunification of Cameroon.

Military 
 The military stadium of Yaoundé (2500 seats)
 The Military headquarters

Health 
 Yaounde University Hospital
 Chantal Biya International Reference Center

Gallery

References